Dikhil  is an airstrip serving the town of Dikhil in the Dikhil Region of Djibouti.

See also
Transport in Djibouti

References

External links
 OurAirports - Djibouti
   Great Circle Mapper - Dikhil
 Dikhil

Airports in Djibouti